The 2022–23 season is the 118th season in the existence of Galatasaray and the club's 65th consecutive season in the top flight of Turkish football. In addition to the domestic league, Galatasaray will participate in this season's edition of the Turkish Cup.

Overview

June
On 11 June 2022, Dursun Özbek has been elected as the new club chairman. This has been the second Özbek era in Galatasaray history.

On 20 June 2022, the contract of Galatasaray Football Team Sporting Director Pasquale Sensibile was terminated.

Cenk Ergün was appointed as the Football Director of Galatasaray Sports Club on 20 June 2022.

As of 21 June 2022, the contracts of Coach Domènec Torrent and his assistants Jordi Gris Vila, Jordi Guerrero Costa, Julián Jiménez Serrano and Ricard Segarra Aragay have been terminated.

On 23 June 2022, Okan Buruk was appointed as the Football Team Coach.

On 27 June 2022, Galatasaray performed the first training of the 2022–23 season at Florya Metin Oktay Facilities under the management of Coach Okan Buruk.

On 28 June 2022, Albert Riera, who was an assistant coach, left his job.

October
On 24 October 2022, the new assistant coach of the yellow-reds, Moritz Volz also took part in the training.

November
In the notification made on 28 November 2022, it was announced that the Galatasaray Football Team will camp in Antalya between 8–16 December in the interim given to the Süper Lig due to the World Cup.

Club

Board of Directors

Facilities

Kits
Galatasaray's 2022–23 kits, manufactured by Nike, released on 17 June 2022 and were up for sale on the same day.

Supplier: Nike
Main sponsor: Sixt

Back sponsor: Nesine.com
Sleeve sponsor: Tunç Holding

Short sponsor:
Socks sponsor:

Management team

Players

Squad information
Players and squad numbers last updated on 17 February 2023. Appearances include all competitions.Note: Flags indicate national team as has been defined under FIFA eligibility rules. Players may hold more than one non-FIFA nationality.

Transfers

Contracts renewals

In

Summer

Winter

Loan in

Summer

Winter

Out

Summer

Winter

Loan out

Summer

Winter

Overall transfer activity

Expenditure 
Summer: €31,540,000 

Winter: €15,400,000 

Total: €46,940,000

Income 
Summer: €13,000,000 

Winter: 

Total: €13,000,000

Net totals 
Summer: €18,540,000 

Winter: €15,400,000 

Total: €33,940,000

Pre-season and friendlies

Pre-season

Mid-season

Competitions

Overall record

Süper Lig

League table

Results summary 

Pld = Matches played; W = Matches won; D = Matches drawn; L = Matches lost; GF = Goals for; GA = Goals against; GD = Goal difference; Pts = Points

Results by round

Matches

Turkish Cup

Statistics

Appearances and goals

Goalscorers

Assists

Clean sheets

Disciplinary record

Game as captain

Injury record

Attendances 

 Sold season tickets: 40,105  (stopped at 40,105)

References

External links 

Galatasaray S.K. (football) seasons
Galatasaray
2022 in Istanbul
2023 in Istanbul
Galatasaray Sports Club 2022–23 season